Dennis Smith (born 26 November 1971) is a South African former first-class cricketer. He is now an umpire and has stood in matches in the Sunfoil Series in South Africa and the Ranji Trophy in India. He is part of Cricket South Africa's umpire panel for first-class matches.

References

External links
 

1971 births
Living people
South African cricketers
South African cricket umpires
Easterns cricketers
Northerns cricketers
Cricketers from Durban